Alfred Morley Derr (May 16, 1903 – April 1, 1970) was an American politician who served as a member of the Idaho Senate from 1937 to 1958.

Career

Derr's senatorial career started in 1937, and he was a member of the Idaho Legislature, serving five terms in the Idaho Senate. Because of a surgery, Derr was succeeded by his wife, Hattie Derr. This was the first instance of a woman serving as a senator. He was the Democratic nominee in the 1958 Idaho gubernatorial election, defeated by the Republican incumbent, Robert E. Smylie.

Outside of politics, Derr worked as a farmer, teacher, and logger.

Personal life 
Derr met his wife, Hattie Derr, while studying at the University of Idaho. His son, Allen Derr, won the landmark 1971 Reed v. Reed U.S. Supreme Court case in 1971 and co-founded for the Idaho Press Club.  Other children include Beverly Shields, John Derr, James Derr, and Jane Betts.

References

1903 births
1970 deaths
University of Idaho alumni
Democratic Party Idaho state senators
20th-century American politicians